Ye Zhizhen (born May 1955) is a Chinese scientist currently serving as a professor and doctoral supervisor at Zhejiang University.

Education
Ye was born in the town of Zaoxi, Cangnan County, Zhejiang in May 1955. During the Cultural Revolution, he was a sent-down youth for seven years. He earned his bachelor's degree in 1982, an master's degree in 1984, and doctor's degree in 1987, all from Zhejiang University.

Career
After graduation, he worked there, where he was promoted to become professor in 1994. He was a visiting scholar at the Massachusetts Institute of Technology (MIT) between 1990 and 1992.

Honours and awards
 2005 State Natural Science Award (Second Class)
 November 22, 2019 Member of the Chinese Academy of Sciences (CAS)

References

1955 births
Living people
People from Cangnan County
Scientists from Wenzhou
Zhejiang University alumni
Academic staff of Zhejiang University
Members of the Chinese Academy of Sciences
Educators from Wenzhou